The 1899 All-Western college football team consists of American football players selected to the All-Western teams chosen by various selectors for the 1899 college football season.

All-Western selections

Ends
 Neil Snow, Michigan (NW) (CFHOF)
 James M. Sheldon, Chicago (NW)

Tackles
 Arthur Hale Curtis, Wisconsin (NW)
 Jonathan E. Webb, Chicago (NW)

Guards
 Richard France, Michigan (NW)
 C. Rogers, Wisconsin (NW)

Centers
 Roy Chamberlain, Wisconsin (NW)

Quarterbacks
 Walter S. Kennedy, Chicago (NW) (CFHOF)

Halfbacks
 Ralph C. Hamill, Chicago (NW)
 John McLean, Michigan (NW)

Fullbacks
 Pat O'Dea, Wisconsin (NW)

Key
NW = The Northwestern

CFHOF = College Football Hall of Fame

See also
1899 College Football All-America Team

References

All-Western team
All-Western college football teams